1-Bromoadamantane is the organobromine compound with the formula (CH2)6(CH)3CBr.  A colorless solid, the compound is a derivative of adamantane with a bromine atom at one of the four equivalent methine positions.  Classified as a tertiary alkyl bromide, it is reluctant to form organometallic derivatives.  With Rieke calcium however it forms the organocalcium derivative, which functions like a Grignard reagent.

References

Organobromides
Adamantanes